The Ijaw National Congress (INC) is a representative body formed in 1991. Members are elected from among the various constituent communities speaking dialects of the Ijaw language. The current INC  President is Barrister Boma Obuoforibo who was elected and sworn on 15 January 2015 and was inaugurated on 2 February 2015 at Ijaw House, Yenagoa in the presence of the Governor of Bayelsa State, Henry Seriake Dickson and other eminent Ijaw personalities.

References

The Guardian 
Ijaw